Life That Glows is a 2016 British nature documentary programme made for BBC Television, first shown in the UK on BBC Two on 9 May 2016. The programme is presented and narrated by Sir David Attenborough.

Life That Glows films the biology and ecology of bioluminescent organisms, that is, capable of creating light. The programme features fireflies, who use light as a means of sexual attraction, luminous fungi, luminous marine bacteria responsible for the Milky seas effect, the flashlight fish, the aposematism of the Sierra luminous millipede, earthworms, the bioluminescent tides created by blooms of dinoflagellates in Tasmania, as well as dolphins swimming in the bloom in the Sea of Cortez, the defensive flashes of brittle stars and ostracods, sexual attraction in ostracods, prey attraction by luminous click beetles in Cerrado, Brazil and the Arachnocampa gnats in New Zealand.

The programme then introduces many luminous deep sea animals, including the vampire squid, the polychaete worm Tomopteris that generates yellow light, the jellyfish Atolla, the comb jelly Beroe, the viper fish, pyrosomes, a dragonfish, and the polychaete worm Flota. Then, the programme discusses specialised adaptations in the eyes of particular animals to see bioluminescence, such as the barreleye fish and the cock-eyed squid. Lastly, they feature the mass spawning event of the firefly squid in Japan.

External links
 
 

2010s British documentary television series
2016 British television series debuts
2016 British television series endings
David Attenborough
BBC television documentaries
Documentary films about nature
Bioluminescence